is a Japanese composer, arranger and music producer. He has provided the music for several anime series, television dramas, movies and video games. He is best known for his role on the soundtrack of The Seven Deadly Sins, Seraph of the End and Highschool of the Dead.

Wada is the founder and current CEO of the music production company Dimension Cruise, established in 2006. He is also the founder of the music agency Beagle Kick.

Biography 
Wada was born in Chiba Prefecture, in 1979. After he finished highschool, he went to Tokyo and later graduated from the Department of Composition at Tokyo College of Music. After that, he studied composition under the music teacher Kazuki Kuriyama, whom Wada would work with as an assistant on future projects.

Wada's musician career started in 2002, with him primarily involved in video game soundtracks.

In 2006, he founded Dimension Cruise, a music agency with the labels Dimension Cruise Records and As Vox Records.

He began composing for anime series in 2009. A year later, he became more popular on the industry for his role as the composer for the series Highschool of the Dead.

Since then, he has been involved in many visual media works, mostly in projects alongside composer Hiroyuki Sawano.

Works

Anime

Television dramas

Movies

Video games

References

External links 
  
 Discography at VGMdb
 
 

1979 births
21st-century Japanese composers
Anime composers
Japanese film score composers
Japanese male musicians
Japanese music arrangers
Japanese television composers
Living people
Video game composers